Air City is a 2007 South Korean television drama starring Lee Jung-jae, Choi Ji-woo, Lee Jin-wook and Moon Jung-hee. It aired on MBC from May 19 to June 8, 2007, on Saturdays and Sundays at 21:40 (KST) for 16 episodes. The series revolves around the work and romance of four airport personnel, showing the inner workings of the airline industry.

It was shot almost entirely at the Incheon International Airport, and as research for the script, four writers interviewed over 200 airport personnel over a two-year stretch.

Synopsis
Han Do-kyung (Choi Ji-woo) was especially scouted by the Incheon Airport director and willingly accepted one-third of the pay she was receiving in Singapore, to come back to Korea as the chief of operations of Incheon International Airport. She is level-headed, speaks five different languages, and remains cool and calm under all circumstances. However, Do-kyung lives with the emotional wounds caused by her estrangement from her sister, Yi-kyung (Lee Da-hee), who is a pilot.

Do-kyung's unflappability is put to the test when she meets rash National Intelligence Service agent Kim Ji-sung (Lee Jung-jae). Acting on instinct whenever he thinks national security is at stake, he often breaks rules and ruffles feathers on the job, bringing him into constant contact, and sometimes conflict, with Do-kyung. After being stationed at the airport, he encounters doctor Seo Myung-woo (Moon Jung-hee), his ex-girlfriend who is now working at the airport clinic, with whom he parted on painful terms.

Meanwhile, another airport employee is Do-kyung's childhood friend Kang Ha-joon (Lee Jin-wook). Ha-joon is quick-tempered with a habit of talking aggressively due to the nature of his job with airport security, watching over thousands of surveillance cameras. But he has a good relationship with all the airport employees, even the cleaners, because of his kind personality. As he and Do-kyung renew their friendship, he becomes a strong source of support for her. His feelings for her quickly turn romantic, despite the complication of Do-kyung being his superior at work.

But Ha-joon's affections remain unrequited, because Ji-sung and Do-kyung, despite struggling with memories and misgivings from the past, find themselves falling for each other.

Cast

Main
 Lee Jung-jae as Kim Ji-sung
 Choi Ji-woo as Han Do-kyung
 Lee Jin-wook as Kang Ha-joon
 Moon Jung-hee as Seo Myung-woo

Supporting
 Park Tam-hee as Jang Nan-young
 Lee Da-hee as Han Yi-kyung, Do-kyung's younger sister
 Park Hyo-joo as Im Ye-won
 Kwon Hae-hyo as Min Byung-kwan, Do-kyung's boss
 Joo Sang-wook as Ahn Kang-hyun
 Kim Jun-ho as Noh Tae-man
 Kwon Young-jin as Kim Soo-chun
 Jang Yong as Lee Jae-mu, Ji-sung's boss
 Choi Ran as Choi Jung-hee
 Yoon Joo-sang as Chief Uhm 
 Shin Shin-ae as Go Eun-ah
 Jung Jin-moo as Min-wook
 Lee Sang-yoon as Kim Jung-min, Do-kyung's first love
 Yoon Jong-hee
 Marco
 Lee Seon-ho
 Kim Yong-hee
 Seo Beom-shik
 Choi Jong-yoon
 Yeo Ho-min

Ratings

Source: TNS Media Korea

International broadcast
Japanese entertainment film Dentsu Inc. bought the series' broadcast rights for reportedly . It aired on cable channel WOWOW starting October 26, 2007.

In Thailand, the drama aired dubbed into Thai under the title ปฏิบัติการรักเหินฟ้า (Patibutkan Rak Hernfha; lit. Love Sky Operation) on the Modernine TV beginning October 14, 2009.

References

External links
 
Air City at MBC Global Media

MBC TV television dramas
Aviation television series
Korean-language television shows
2007 South Korean television series debuts
2007 South Korean television series endings
South Korean romance television series
South Korean action television series
Television shows set in Incheon
Television series by HB Entertainment
Television series by AStory